Hepatica americana, the round-lobed hepatica, is a herbaceous flowering plant in the buttercup family Ranunculaceae. It is native to the eastern United States and Canada.

It is sometimes considered part of the genus Anemone, as Anemone americana, A. hepatica, or A. nobilis.

References

Ranunculaceae
americana
Flora of North America